Zhytomyrska is a Ukrainian name which may mean:
 Zhytomyrska (Kyiv Metro), a station on the Kyiv Metro.
 Zhytomyrska Oblast of Ukraine.